The Episcopal Diocese of Chicago is the official organization of the Episcopal Church in Chicago and Northern Illinois, US.  The diocese is headed by Bishop Paula Clark, who is the first woman and first African-American to lead the diocese. The diocese was previously served by Jeffrey Lee, who served as bishop until December 31, 2020.  The mother church of the diocese is St. James Cathedral, which is the oldest Episcopal congregation in the city of Chicago.

The Diocese of Chicago covers 39 counties located in the northern and western part of the state of Illinois, stretching from the shores of Lake Michigan on the east, to the banks of the Mississippi River on the west. Its northern boundary is the state of Wisconsin; the southernmost congregation is located in Griggsville, Illinois.

History
The diocese was founded in 1835 as the Episcopal Diocese of Illinois. Philander Chase, the retired bishop of Ohio, was the first bishop. He was succeeded in 1852 by Henry John Whitehouse, a priest previously from New York. Edward McLaren, elected bishop in 1875, saw the Diocese of Illinois divided into three parts in 1877. The newly formed dioceses of Quincy and Springfield elected their own bishops, while McClaren's diocese was renamed the Episcopal Diocese of Chicago.

Present day
The Diocese of Chicago ranks among the 12 largest Episcopal dioceses in the United States, with 137 congregations, of which 36 are missions. However, in parallel with declining national memberships, the diocese has seen a decline in membership: 47,171 baptized members in 1994, but only 42,667 in 1996. As of 2011 the diocese website said it had 40,000 members.

The diocese is far more ethnically diverse than the Episcopal Church at large. There are four Hispanic congregations, one of which is located in the near western suburbs of Chicago. In addition, four congregations outside Chicago provide Spanish language services, and two others share their facilities with congregations of the Philippine Independent Church. There is one Korean American congregation, and the diocese also serves eight African-American congregations. Minority outreach, like the kind found at the Cathedral Shelter of Chicago continues to this day.

The 25th Presiding Bishop of the Episcopal Church, Frank Griswold, was bishop of Chicago when he was elected in 1997.

Bishop Jeffrey Lee assumed office in 2008. On February 14, 2019, Lee announced his intention to retire in August 2020. Paula Clark was elected as the thirteenth bishop on December 12, 2020, to assume office in 2021. Clark experienced health issues in April 2021 which required postponement of her assuming office until her health improved.  Clark's health subsequently improved and she was consecrated as Bishop on September 17, 2022.

Reunification
In 2008, a majority of laity and clergy in the neighboring Episcopal Diocese of Quincy left to form a diocese in the more conservative Anglican Church in North America. The remaining Episcopalians in Quincy reformed their diocese, electing John Buchanan, retired Bishop of West Missouri as their provisional bishop. In 2012 Quincy officials approached Lee and the leadership of the Chicago diocese about the possibility of reunification with Chicago, since it was determined that a remnant diocese would be too small in membership and too geographically dispersed to be viable in the long term.

In November 2012 the Chicago diocese's convention agreed that reunification with the Quincy diocese should be pursued. On June 8, 2013, both diocesan conventions voted unanimously to reunify. The reunification was ratified by a majority of bishops and the standing committees of the Episcopal Church, and on September 1, 2013, the Diocese of Quincy merged into the Diocese of Chicago as the Peoria Deanery.

Diocesan Bishops of Illinois and of Chicago

Other bishops of the diocese

List of deaneries
 Aurora Deanery
 Chicago-North Deanery
 Chicago-South Deanery
 Chicago-West Deanery
 Elgin Deanery
 Evanston Deanery
 Joliet Deanery
 Kankakee Deanery
 Oak Park Deanery
 Peoria Deanery
 Rockford Deanery
 Waukegan Deanery

See also
 Episcopal Diocese of Springfield
 Episcopal Diocese of Quincy
 List of Episcopal bishops

References

External links
Official website
Journal of the Annual Convention of the Protestant Episcopal Church in the Diocese of Illinois at the Online Books Page.
Journal of the Annual Convention of the Protestant Episcopal Church in the Diocese of Chicago at the Online Books Page.

Chicago
Chicago
Bishops in the Episcopal Diocese of Chicago
Bishops
Chicago
Christianity in Chicago
Diocese of Chicago
Religious organizations established in 1877
Anglican dioceses established in the 19th century
1877 establishments in Illinois
Province 5 of the Episcopal Church (United States)